The Rumour Said Fire is a Danish band, founded in 2008 by singer, songwriter and guitarist Jesper Lidang.

History 
The group performed for the first time together in May 2008 and opened in 2009 for Passion Pit in Copenhagen. 

The group released the single Evil Son in August 2009, followed by their debut EP The Life and Death of a Male Body 21 September 2009. In October the subsequent single The Balcony,  was released.

The group won the P3 Guld prize in the category "The P3 Talent 2009."

On 20 September 2010 The Rumour Said Fire released the single Sentimentally Falling, from their second album The Arrogant, which was released in October 2010. The single was on P3's Uungåelige.

Their single The Balcony has received modest airplay in Denmark.

Discography

Studio album 
 2010: The Arrogant
 2012: Dead Ends
 2017: Crush

EPs 
 2009: The Life and Death of a Male Body

Singles 
 2009: Evil Son
 2009: The Balcony
 2010: Sentimentally Falling
 2010: Passion
 2012: Dead Leaves
 2013: Voyager
 2017: Television Personalities
 2017: Out of the Way
 2019: Retaliation

References

External links 
 P3 Playlistnyt
 The Rumour Said Fire on MySpace

Danish musical groups
Musical groups established in 2008